Army General Lê Văn Tỵ (17 May 1904 – 20 October 1964) was the first chief of staff of the Army of the Republic of Vietnam. He replaced Nguyễn Văn Hinh as joint general chief of staff. He was previously a general in the Vietnamese National Army of the State of Vietnam, which became the Republic of Vietnam in 1955 after Prime Minister Ngô Đình Diệm deposed Emperor Bảo Đại in a fraudulent referendum.

Tỵ's deteriorating health forced him to retire in 1964. He succumbed to cancer in 1964. He was a recipient of the National Order of Vietnam.

He is also the only General of the Republic of Vietnam to be promoted to the 5-star rank of Army General.

References

1904 births
1964 deaths
Army of the Republic of Vietnam generals
Recipients of the National Order of Vietnam
South Vietnamese military personnel of the Vietnam War
Deaths from cancer in Vietnam